The Treaty of Dorpat (Tartu) was concluded in May 1564, during the Livonian War. Ivan IV of Russia accepted the subordinance of Reval (Tallinn) and some Livonian castles to Erik XIV of Sweden, and in turn Erik XIV accepted the subordinance of the rest of Livonia to Ivan IV. Subsequently, Russia and Sweden agreed on a seven-years' truce.

References

Livonian War
Treaties of the Swedish Empire
1564 in Europe
16th century in Estonia
Dorpat
History of Tartu
1564 in Sweden
1564 treaties
Russia–Sweden treaties